Stephen Mark Konroyd  (born February 10, 1961) is a Canadian former professional ice hockey defenceman. He formally served as a co-host of intermission and post-game segments on NBC Sports Chicago broadcasts of Chicago Blackhawks' games.

Playing career
Konroyd started his NHL career in 1981 with the Calgary Flames. Over the course of his NHL career he would spend time with the New York Islanders, Chicago Blackhawks, Hartford Whalers, Detroit Red Wings and Ottawa Senators.

Steve Konroyd was a sound positional defenceman who could also make crisp outlet passes to his forwards. He played nearly 900 regular season games with six different clubs.

As a junior, Konroyd played three years with the Oshawa Generals where he was captain and accumulating 125 points. The steady blueliner was chosen 39th overall by the Calgary Flames in the 1980 NHL Entry Draft. They gave him a four-game look in 1980–81 before sending him back to junior where he scored 68 points in 59 games. Following that strong showing, he was voted to the OHL second all-star team.

Beginning in 1981–82, Konroyd played nearly five years as a regular on the Flames' blueline. His steady play made him an asset for Canada when they won the silver medal at the 1985 World Championships. The Flames were competitive during this period but were overshadowed by the success of the high-flying Edmonton Oilers. Prior to the trading deadline in 1986, Konroyd and Richard Kromm were sent to the New York Islanders for Stanley Cup veteran John Tonelli.

Konroyd solidified the Islanders' defence for nearly two and a half years until he was traded to the Chicago Blackhawks in November 1988. Now that he was no longer as mobile as in his younger days, the close checking style of the Hawks suited his game. Konroyd was a solid defender on Chicago when they led the NHL in regular season points in 1990–91. Following the Hawks first round upset at the hands of the Minnesota North Stars, Konroyd joined team Canada at the 1991 World Championships and won another silver medal. Halfway through the next season he was traded to the Hartford Whalers for Rob Brown. Konroyd later served as a role player for Detroit, Ottawa, and Calgary before retiring in 1995.

After retiring, in 1996-'97 Konroyd became the 1st ever radio color analyst for the Phoenix Coyotes for one year and then landed the TV color analyst job with the San Jose Sharks 1997-2000. In 2000 he became the TV Color analyst for the Columbus Blue Jackets for 4 years. Konroyd then took on the job of TV studio analyst and part time TV color analyst with the Chicago Blackhawks from 2005-2021. Konroyd currently is a studio analyst for the NHL Network.

Konroyd resided in Hinsdale, Illinois with his wife Juli (Chicago native) and their 5 children. Danielle, Emily, Declan, Braelyn, and Stephen.

Career statistics

Regular season and playoffs

International

External links
 

1961 births
Living people
Arizona Coyotes announcers
Calgary Flames draft picks
Calgary Flames players
Canadian ice hockey defencemen
Chicago Blackhawks players
Chicago Wolves (IHL) players
Columbus Blue Jackets announcers
Detroit Red Wings players
Hartford Whalers players
New York Islanders players
Oklahoma City Stars players
Oshawa Generals players
Ottawa Senators players
San Jose Sharks announcers
Sportspeople from Scarborough, Toronto
Ice hockey people from Toronto